Kenneth Tyler Agostino (born April 30, 1992) is an American professional ice hockey forward who most currently plays for Torpedo Nizhny Novgorod of the Kontinental Hockey League (KHL). He was a fifth-round selection, 140th overall, of the Pittsburgh Penguins at the 2010 NHL Entry Draft and was acquired by the Calgary Flames in the Jarome Iginla trade. Agostino played four seasons of college hockey for the Yale Bulldogs and was a member of the school's 2013 national championship winning team.

Playing career
Agostino is a native of the Flanders, New Jersey section of Mount Olive Township, New Jersey. As a youth, he played in the 2005 Quebec International Pee-Wee Hockey Tournament with the New Jersey Devils minor ice hockey team.

Agostino played high school hockey for Delbarton School (along with twin brothers Trevor & Davis), where he graduated as the school's all-time leading scorer with 261 points. He was named New Jersey High School Player of the Year by the Newark Star-Ledger in 2009 and 2010 and recorded 50 goals and 83 points in his senior year of 2009–10. The Pittsburgh Penguins selected Agostino with their fifth-round pick, 140th overall, at the 2010 NHL Entry Draft.

Agostino committed to play college hockey for the Yale Bulldogs, and on January 2, 2011, became only the third freshman in school history to record a hat-trick; he added two assists to his three goals in the game to tie a school record with five points by a freshman in a 10–3 victory over the Holy Cross Crusaders. After finishing with 25 points in 2010–11, Agostino improved to 34 points in his sophomore season of 2011–12. As a junior, he was Yale's leading scorer with 41 points in 37 games. As he prepared for the 2013 Frozen Four national championship tournament, the Penguins traded Agostino's NHL rights. Pittsburgh also sent Ben Hanowski and a first-round draft pick to the Calgary Flames in exchange for Jarome Iginla on March 27, 2013.

Yale reached the championship game and defeated Quinnipiac 4–0 to win the first NCAA team championship of any sport in the school's history. Agostino considered turning professional following the win but opted to return for his senior season with the Bulldogs. He completed his final season, 2013–14, with 32 points in 32 games. Over his four-year college career, Agostino recorded 132 points in 134 games. He turned professional at the conclusion of Yale's season and signed a two-year contract with the Flames worth $900,000 per season. Agostino made his NHL debut on March 21, 2014, in a 6–5 loss to the Nashville Predators. His first goal came on April 4, against goaltender Roberto Luongo in a 2–1 victory over the Florida Panthers.

On July 2, 2016, Agostino, having left the Flames organization after not being tendered a qualifying offer, signed a one-year, two-way contract as a free agent with the St. Louis Blues. Assigned to the Blues' AHL affiliate, the Chicago Wolves, Agostino was named the American Hockey League MVP in the 2016–17 season after posting 24 goals while leading the league with 59 assists and 83 points in 65 games with the Wolves.

On the first day of the 2017 free agency window on July 1, Agostino signed a one-year, one-way $850,000 deal with the Boston Bruins.

Unable to break in with the Bruins, Agostino left as a free agent in the off-season to sign a one-year, two-way $700,000 contract with the Montreal Canadiens on July 1, 2018. Agostino began the 2018–19 season in the AHL with affiliate, the Laval Rocket. On November 7, 2018, Agostino was recalled by the Canadiens after injuries to regulars Joel Armia and Paul Byron. At the time, he was the lead scorer of the Rocket, with 4 goals and 10 points. He eclipsed his previous stints in the NHL, registering 11 points in 36 games with the Canadiens before he was placed on waivers and later claimed by hometown team, the New Jersey Devils, on February 11, 2019. He was claimed by general manager Ray Shero, who originally drafted him while with the Penguins in 2010.

As the New Jersey Devils did not choose to re-sign Agostino, he left as a free agent and signed with the Toronto Maple Leafs on a two-year, one-way $700,000 contract. The deal was officially announced by the team nearly a month after it was initially rumored, on July 24.

Having played as a journeyman with 6 NHL clubs through 8 professional seasons, Agostino opted to pursue a career abroad, agreeing to a one-year contract as a free agent with Russian club Torpedo Nizhny Novgorod of the KHL on June 1, 2021.

Career statistics

Regular season and playoffs

International

Awards and honors

References

External links
 

1992 births
Living people
Adirondack Flames players
American men's ice hockey forwards
Boston Bruins players
Calgary Flames players
Chicago Wolves players
Delbarton School alumni
Laval Rocket players
Montreal Canadiens players
New Jersey Devils players
Ice hockey players from New Jersey
People from Morristown, New Jersey
People from Mount Olive Township, New Jersey
Pittsburgh Penguins draft picks
Providence Bruins players
St. Louis Blues players
Sportspeople from Morris County, New Jersey
Stockton Heat players
Toronto Maple Leafs players
Toronto Marlies players
Torpedo Nizhny Novgorod players
Yale Bulldogs men's ice hockey players
Ice hockey players at the 2022 Winter Olympics
Olympic ice hockey players of the United States